The National Sevens is a rugby sevens tournament for New Zealand provincial teams. It is held annually and features a men's event and a women's event. The best teams in the country compete over two days for the respective men's and women's titles. The tournament is currently held in Tauranga.

The National Sevens also serves as an opportunity for players to be selected in New Zealand's national sevens teams.

History
The National Sevens was first held in 1975 in Auckland, where Marlborough were the very first champions. Since then the tournament has been held every year (except 1987, 1988, and 2003) and held at various venues. A women's competition was introduced for the 1998 tournament in Roturura. In the first three decades Palmerston North hosted the National Sevens thirteen times, the last of which was in 2002. This was also the last tournament to host women's sevens until women's teams were reintroduced a decade later.

The National Sevens moved to Queenstown for ten seasons from 2004. The 2009 event was the first tournament where the entire event was screened live by Sky TV. A women's competition was reinstated in 2013. The National Sevens was relocated to Rotorua in 2014 and then to Tauranga in December 2018.

Format
The sixteen teams for men are divided into four pools. On day one each team plays the other three teams in its pool. The top two teams from each pool qualify for the championship playoffs while the bottom two enter the bowl competition.

Venue
The first tournament was held in Auckland in 1975. From there it moved to various venues around the country: Christchurch, Blenheim, Hamilton, Palmerston North, Feilding, Pukekohe and Rotorua. From 2004 to 2013 it was hosted in Queenstown at the Recreation Ground, which is usually the home of the Wakatipu Rugby Club. The tournament then returned to Rotorua for five seasons and, since December 2018, it is held in Tauranga.

Participants

The following teams have participated in the tournament:

Results by year

Men's tournament
National Sevens winners since 1975:

1975–2002

Notes
 There were two events in 1996 due to a seasonal switch from March to November. Waikato won four titles between 1996 and 1998.

2004–2013
The National Sevens switched from a November schedule to a January schedule for the 2003–04 season and, as such, the 2002 tournament was followed by the 2004 tournament. The new venue was the Recreation Ground in Queenstown which hosted the National Sevens for ten years from 2004 to 2013.

2014 onwards
The tournament moved from Queenstown to Rotorua in 2014 for five seasons. A switch from playing in January to December coincided with the event moving to Tauranga for the 2018–19 season.

Women's tournament
Women's teams initially competed at the National Sevens from 1998 through to 2002. After a ten-season absence, the women's tournament was reintroduced for the 2013 National Sevens held in Queenstown, with Manawatu earning the title. The tournament then moved to Rotorua in 2014 for five seasons. A switch from playing in January to December coincided with the event moving to Tauranga for the 2018–19 season.

1998–2002

2013 onwards

References

External links